Ebor is the abbreviation of the Latin Eboracum, the early name of York in Britain. It may also mean:

 Ebor, the legal alias of the Archbishops of York
 Ebor, Manitoba, a community in Canada
 Ebor, New South Wales, a village in Australia
 Ebor, a post-nominal used after the degree letters to indicate that it was awarded by the University of York
 Ebor (horse), a British Thoroughbred racehorse
 Ebor Handicap, a horse race run at York Racecourse in August
 Ebor Festival, the four day race meeting at which this race is run
 EBOR, Experimental Beryllium Oxide Reactor, a nuclear reactor at the Idaho National Laboratory, USA
 Ebor Way, a footpath in Yorkshire, England
 The Ebor Singers, a choir at the University of York, England
 Ebor Falls, waterfalls in New South Wales, Australia